is a Japanese bishōjo eroge for MS-DOS. It was translated to English in 1996 by JAST USA, and re-released for modern Windows systems in 2002 as part of the "JAST USA Memorial Pack". It is widely regarded as one of their best early games. This popularity can be attributed to the game's strong characters, evocative setting, and high replay value: each of the girls has her own personality and story, and in some cases it is difficult to make the correct choices to get together with a particular girl.

The game contains some thinly veiled references to several popular anime series, including Neon Genesis Evangelion, Magic Knight Rayearth and Saint Tail: each of the female characters bears a striking resemblance in appearance and (in most cases) personality to a girl from one of these anime.

Gameplay
The player controls Shuji Yamagami, a Japanese high school student, over the course of a Japanese school year from April to March. The game is played by reading through text and selecting actions for Shuji to perform. The actions are chosen by combining a verb and a target from a menu, so a typical set of options to choose from might consist of LOOK -> (at the) ROOM, LOOK -> (at) REIKO, THINK -> (about) REIKO, TALK -> (to) MAKOTO, TALK -> (to) REIKO.

Plot
Shuji meets eight girls over the course of the year, any of whom can end up as his girlfriend – if the player makes the right decisions. The setting and scenes are romantic: the game skips over the drudgery of school life and focuses on holidays and time spent with his friends, as he gradually falls in love with one of the girls.

Characters
Shuji Yamagami
The main character whose actions the player controls. While he apparently succeeds at virtually everything he tries, he is clueless about girls. He is also completely unable to swim and is terrified of the ocean.

Reiko Sawamura
Two years older than the main character. A kind-hearted girl and strong swimmer. Looks like Umi Ryuzaki from Magic Knight Rayearth.

Kiyomi Shinfuji
A classmate of Shuji's. Academically gifted and a little shy. Looks like Fuu Hououji from Magic Knight Rayearth.

Mio Suzuki
A bright and active girl in Shuji's year who loves tennis. Looks like Hikaru Shidou from Magic Knight Rayearth.

Ruri Shiromizu
A very introverted and quiet girl who transfers into Shuji's class. She initially refuses to smile or even talk to anyone. Looks like Rei Ayanami from Neon Genesis Evangelion.

Aki Hinagiku
A loud and aggressive girl in Mio's class. She is Mio's rival in tennis and looks like Asuka Langley from Neon Genesis Evangelion.

Seia Yoshida
A gentle and kind girl in Shuji's class who is a strong Catholic. Looks like Seira Mimori from Saint Tail.

Meimi Nakano
A stubborn argumentative girl in Shuji's class. Cares little about school because she plans to join her mother's circus troupe. Looks like Meimi Haneoka from Saint Tail.

Shoko Nishino
A shallow girl in Reiko's class who likes football. Looks like Shoko Inaba from Welcome to Pia Carrot, another dating sim.

Kyoko Kobayashi
The homeroom teacher of Shuji's class. Easy-going and informal, she sometimes meets up with her students socially. Looks like Misato Katsuragi from Neon Genesis Evangelion.

Makoto Shimazaki
Shuji's best friend, a boy who loves playing at anything military. Looks like Kensuke Aida from Neon Genesis Evangelion.

Development and release history

The characters' ages were altered as part of the process of translation from Japanese to English. The main male character and most of the girls were originally sixteen and in the first year of high school, with only the two characters in third year being age 18. However, in order to avoid controversy over the sex scenes involving these girls who were younger than the American age of consent, JAST changed the ages to 18 for first years and 20 for the third years, claiming that the game's Kotobuki Preparatory School was a special institution for students who'd finished school. In spite of the translation efforts, the first interactive selection prompts the following text: "I'm Shuji Yamagami, sixteen years old."

Reception

References

External links
 JAST USA

1996 video games
DOS games
Eroge
Visual novels
Bishōjo games
Video games developed in Japan
Windows games